In the Teeth of the Evidence is a collection of short stories by Dorothy L. Sayers first published by Victor Gollancz in 1939.
The book's title is taken from the first story in the collection.

Contents
Lord Peter Wimsey stories:
"In the Teeth of the Evidence"A dentist is poisoned and dies in a car fire, supposedly by suicide or accident, but Wimsey suspects murder and identity fraud.
"Absolutely Elsewhere"Wealthy debt-collector Mr. Grimbold is murdered, but all the suspects have alibis related to a series of phone calls, which Wimsey and Parker must unravel.
Montague Egg stories:
"A Shot at Goal"Mr. Egg is drawn into a murder mystery revolving around a heated football controversy. 
"Dirt Cheap"A fellow traveling salesman is murdered for his jewelry case, and the evidence of Mr. Egg's clock helps to avenge him.
"Bitter Almonds"An old gentleman's death causes great embarrassment for Mr. Egg when one of his own wines is involved.
"False Weight"Mr. Egg investigates another fellow traveling salesman's death, this time with bigamy as the motive.
"The Professor's Manuscript"Ill-fitting false teeth and a strange set of old books tip Mr. Egg off that something is not right with one of his new clients.
Other stories:
"The Milk-Bottles"A terrible smell and accumulating milk bottles cause neighbors to think a quarrelsome neighbor has murdered his wife.
"Dilemma"Two men exchange stories of doubt, one a doctor who saved a vital manuscript on sleeping sickness instead of a drunken butler in a fire, and the other a detective who saved a delinquent child in a fire instead of the evidence that would get an accused man acquitted.
"An Arrow O'er the House"A devoted secretary and her author employer find themselves embroiled in a mystery eerily similar to something he wrote.
"Scrawns"A young lady is given a job in a house with some terrifying fellow servants.
"Nebuchadnezzar"An elaborate, Biblical-themed game of charades causes a man with a guilty secret to suspect someone knows what he has done.
"The Inspiration of Mr. Budd"- An impoverished hairdresser desperate for clients must make a terrible choice when he realizes his latest client is a wanted murderer.
"Blood Sacrifice"A playwright tricked by a legal contract into drastically altering his beloved script finds himself in the position of having to save the life of the man who deceived him.
"Suspicion"A man suspects a woman of murder but has no proof.
"The Leopard Lady"A sinister removal van sparks a mystery.
"The Cyprian Cat"A supernatural story in which a man who fears cats encounters a woman who behaves like one, and a strange feral cat that seems to be haunting him.

1939 short story collections
Short story collections by Dorothy L. Sayers
Victor Gollancz Ltd books